Compsoctena psammosticha is a moth in the family Eriocottidae. It was described by Edward Meyrick in 1921. It is found in Malawi, South Africa and Zimbabwe.

The wingspan is 25–30 mm. The forewings are ochreous, suffusedly reticulated with brownish ochreous. The hindwings are dark grey.

References

Moths described in 1921
Compsoctena
Lepidoptera of Malawi
Lepidoptera of Zimbabwe
Lepidoptera of South Africa
Moths of Sub-Saharan Africa